Trout Lake Aeroodrome  is located on the shore of Graham Lake, just north of the community of Trout Lake, Alberta, Canada.

References

Trout Lake
Municipal District of Opportunity No. 17